Pucusana is a district in southern Lima Province in Peru. It is bordered by the Pacific Ocean on the west, the district of Santa María del Mar on the north, the Chilca District of the Cañete Province on the east, and the Pacific Ocean  on the south. 
It is well known for its beaches and attracts many beachgoers every summer. Many of them also rent apartments during this season, making its population increase considerably. The district has some restaurants and a club with a large seawater swimming pool. The most popular beaches in the district are Naplo and La Tiza.

See also 
 Administrative divisions of Peru

References

External links
 
  Municipalidad Distrital de Pucusana
 Portal del Balneario de Pucusana

Districts of Lima